Jan Redmann (born 16 December 1979) is a German lawyer and politician of the Christian Democratic Union (CDU) who has been serving as a member of the State Parliament of Brandenburg since 2014. Since 2019, he has been chairing his party’s parliamentary group.

Early life and career
Redmann was born 1979 in the East German town of Pritzwalk. He studied law at the University of Potsdam and the University of Cologne and became a lawyer.

Political career
Redmann became member of the State Parliament of Brandenburg in the 2014 elections.

References 

1979 births
Living people
People from Pritzwalk
Members of the Landtag of Brandenburg
Christian Democratic Union of Germany politicians
University of Cologne alumni